The Spirit of '76 (1917) was a controversial silent film that depicted both factual and fictional events during the American Revolutionary War. The film was directed by Frank Montgomery and produced and written by Robert Goldstein. Goldstein would later go to Federal prison for violating the Espionage Act, because of scenes depicted in the film. No prints of the movie have been known to survive, and it is categorized as a lost film.

Synopsis
A romance between King George III of Great Britain and a Quaker girl, Catherine, who becomes his morganatic wife, forms the early part of the story. Catherine is really half native, being the daughter of a French adventurer and an indigenous woman, adopted and brought to England by a Quaker voyager. The hardships of the American colonists are shown and their rebellion against the English rule. In this rebellion, Catherine sees a chance to avenge herself upon the King, who has legally married a German princess. She goes to America and becomes a power over a tribe of indigenous people. One of her aides is her own brother, who had been adopted by a colonist. Brother and sister are unaware of the relationship until the close of the story. The gallant fight which the Americans under General Washington wage against the English troops and the indigenous people under Catherine's lead forms a thrilling phase of the story and the chief incidents with which every American is familiar are dramatically set forth. In addition, there are several minor plots and romances, some of which end happily, others tragically, when the war is over and the fight for freedom won.
Motography (1917)

Cast
Adda Gleason - Catherine Montour
Howard Gaye - Lionel Esmond 
George Chesborough - Walter Butler
Chief Dark Cloud - Joseph Brant
Doris Pawn - Madeline Brant
Jack Cosgrove (actor) - George III
Norval McGregor - Lorimer Steuart
Jane Novak - Cecil Steuart
William Colby - Sir John Johnson
Lottie Cruez - Peggy Johnson
Chief Big Tree - Gowah
William Freeman - Lord Chatham
William Lawrence - Captain Boyd
William Beery - George Washington
Ben Lewis - Benjamin Franklin
Jack McCready - Tim Murphy

Production
The film was produced by Robert Goldstein (born September 21, 1883), a California native of German Jewish ancestry, and a costume supplier in Los Angeles.  Goldstein outfitted the cast of D. W. Griffith's The Birth of a Nation (1915), and was reportedly inspired by Griffith's film to produce a cinematic interpretation of the American Revolution.  Griffith initially encouraged and cooperated with Goldstein, but later distanced himself from that project in favor of pursuing his own treatment of the subject, the 1924 film America.

The Spirit of '76 depicted multiple atrocities committed by the British side during the war, including soldiers bayoneting babies and raping unarmed women, the Wyoming massacre, and the Cherry Valley massacre.  It also contained scenes with no known factual basis, such as a physical assault on Benjamin Franklin by King George III, and a sexual liaison between the king and Catherine Montour — possibly based on his supposed (and equally fictitious) relationship with Hannah Lightfoot.

Government censorship and confiscation
The film premiered in Chicago in May 1917 — just one month after the United States entered World War I on the side of Britain. The head of Chicago's police censorship board, Metallus Lucullus Cicero Funkhouser, confiscated the film at the behest of the Justice department on grounds that it generated hostility toward Britain.  Goldstein trimmed the offending scenes and received federal approval to continue the Chicago run; but the film premiered in Los Angeles a few months later with the deleted scenes restored.  After an investigation, the government concluded that Goldstein's action constituted "aiding and abetting the German enemy", and seized the film once again.

Criminal prosecution
Goldstein was charged in federal court with violating the Espionage Act. At trial, the U.S. prosecutor argued that as the war effort demanded total Allied support, Goldstein's film was seditious on its face. Goldstein was convicted on charges of attempted incitement to riot and to cause insubordination, disloyalty, and mutiny by U.S. soldiers then in uniform as well as prospective recruits, and he was sentenced to 10 years in prison.  Implications were made throughout the trial that Goldstein was a German spy, although no evidence was presented in support of that accusation.  The judgment was later upheld by an appellate court.  Goldstein's attorneys were unable to argue for protection under the First Amendment because the Supreme Court had ruled in 1915 that movies lacked such protection.  (That ruling was overturned in 1952.)  His sentence was later commuted to three years by President Wilson.

Aftermath
After his release from jail, Goldstein tried and failed to re-establish himself as a filmmaker in the Netherlands, Switzerland, Italy, and England (which refused him a visa).  Eventually he landed in Germany, where he was equally unsuccessful.  His biographer, Anthony Slide, could locate no communications from him after 1935, and thought it likely that he perished in a Nazi concentration camp.

After Slide's book was published, a telegram sent from New York City in 1938 was discovered. In the telegram, Goldstein referred to "my enforced return [to the U.S.], three years ago..." suggesting that the Germans had deported him in 1935. Review of 1935 Immigration and Naturalization Service arriving passenger records show him arriving in New York City on August, 16, 1935, ship name SS Albert Ballin with departure port of Hamburg, Germany. 

His confirmed whereabouts after 1938 are unknown. However, we see through contemporary records that in March 1940 he filed for Social Security using his given name ROBERT GOLDSTEIN, birth date September 27, 1883, in San Francisco, CA, son of Simon Goldstein and Margret (sic) Moran. There is circumstantial US Federal Census evidence that may place him as an inmate in Rikers Island Penitentiary in 1940  and again as an inmate in Willard Asylum for the Chronic Insane in 1950. In both cases there is an inmate named Robert Goldstein born in California with a birth date within 2-3 years of 1883.

Robert's younger brother, Louis Stanislaus Goldstein (September 9, 1894-April 25, 1950), passed away in 1950. His obituary in the Los Angeles Times makes no mention of Robert.

Legacy
In his 1995 book Lies My Teacher Told Me: Everything Your American History Textbook Got Wrong, Prof. James Loewen notes that Goldstein's prosecution was consistent with Wilson's targeting anyone suspecting of holding anti-British views, which the president claimed gave aid to Germany.

See also
List of lost films
 List of films about the American Revolution
 List of television series and miniseries about the American Revolution

References

Further reading
 Selig, Michael. "United States v. Motion Picture Film The Spirit of'76: The Espionage Case of Producer Robert Goldstein (1917)." Journal of Popular Film and Television (1983)  10#4 pp: 168-174. online
 Slide, Anthony. Robert Goldstein and "The Spirit of '76" (1993)

External links

American Law report on Goldstein Trial
Federal Reporter on Goldstein's trial
Article from The Jewish Atlanta Times
Article from Slate Magazine

1917 films
1917 drama films
American Revolutionary War films
1910s English-language films
American black-and-white films
American silent feature films
Films set in the 1770s
Films set in Pennsylvania
Film censorship in the United States
Film controversies in the United States
Lost American films
Silent American drama films
1917 lost films
Lost drama films
1910s American films